The Richard and Karen Carpenter Performing Arts Center in Long Beach, California is a theater that hosts a variety of events, including films, forums, and musical and theatrical performances. The venue is located on the campus of California State University, Long Beach. It was built in 1994 and has seating for 1,054. The stage area was modeled after the New York State Theater of the Arts at Lincoln Center. The Carpenter Performing Arts Center is named for Richard and Karen Carpenter, alumni of the university and donors to the center. 

Musical Theatre West has been producing shows at the Carpenter Performing Arts Center since 1997.

References

External links 
 CPAC Web Site

Music venues in California
Concert halls in California
Buildings and structures in Long Beach, California
Culture of Long Beach, California
California State University, Long Beach
University and college arts centers in the United States
Tourist attractions in Los Angeles County, California
Performing arts centers in California
Event venues established in 1994
1994 establishments in California